Margareta Capsia (1682 – 20 June 1759) was a Swedish/Finnish artist, the first professional native female artist in Finland, which during her lifetime was a part of Sweden. She mainly painted altarpieces, but was also active as a portrait painter.

Biography and career
Capsia was born in Sweden, the child of Gottfried Capsia and Anna Schultz. She married the priest Jacob Gavelin in Stockholm in 1719. After the Great Northern War in 1721 they moved to Vasa (Fi. Vaasa), where Margareta became known as an altarpiece painter in Österbotten.

In 1730, they moved to Åbo (Fi. Turku), where she became a famous artist throughout Finland, and where she eventually died. Her altarpieces were described as individual illustrations of the bible, and she was regarded as one of the best painters in the genre together with Mikael Toppelius.  She painted the altarpieces of a long line of churches, such as in the churches of Paltamo in 1727 and Säkylä in 1739.

References
 Ladies' Salon
 Aartomaa, Ulla (toim.), Naisten salonki, 1700-luvun eurooppalaisia naistaiteilijoita. WSOY 2007. 
 Ars : Suomen taide 2. 1988: C. Granroth, Margareta Capsia. 
 C. Granroth, Margareta Capsia : biografiska uppgifter och tre bibliska motiv / pro gradu, taidehistorian laitos, Helsingin yliopisto. 1985; A. Luukko, Vaasan historia II. 1979. 
 Evl.fi - Finnish Church Art and Architecture 
  

1682 births
1759 deaths
18th-century Finnish artists
17th-century Finnish people
Swedish painters
17th-century Finnish painters
17th-century women artists
17th-century Finnish women
18th-century Finnish women
Finnish women painters